Kato Ajanare (1959) is an unfinished Bengali drama film directed by Ritwik Ghatak. The storyline was based on a Bengali novel written by Mani Shankar Mukherjee with the same title. The film was shot on a 20-day schedule. The shooting was complete, except the court scene. The film was discontinued and abandoned for mainly financial and some other problems.

Shooting was arranged in the technician's studio for indoor shooting and Kolkata (then Calcutta) high court area for outdoor shooting. Seven reels were restored later by Ritwik Memorial Trust.

Cast and crew

Cast
Anil Chatterjee as Shankar
Chhabi Biswas as Rempini
Kali Banerjee as Noel Barwell
Utpal Dutta as Dutch sailor
Ashim Kumar
Karuna Banerjee
Geeta Dey

Crew
 Producer: Mihir Laha
 Direction: Ritwik Ghatak
 Story: Mani Shankar Mukherjee
 Screenplay: Ritwik Ghatak
 Cinematography: Dilip Ranjan Mukherjee
 Editing: Ramen Joshi

See also
Bagalar Banga Darshan
Bedeni (film)
 List of works of Ritwik Ghatak

References

External links

Bengali-language Indian films
1950s unfinished films
Films based on Indian novels
Films shot in Kolkata
Films based on works by Mani Shankar Mukherjee